The New Armies (Traditional Chinese: 新軍, Simplified Chinese: 新军; Pinyin: Xīnjūn, Manchu: Ice cooha), more fully called the Newly Created Army ( Xinjian Lujun), was the modernised army corps formed under the Qing dynasty in December 1895, following its defeat in the First Sino-Japanese War. It was envisioned as militia fully trained and equipped according to Western standards. In 1903 an imperial edict expanded it to 36 divisions of 12,500 men each, or total of 450,000. It was known as the Beiyang Army, and was under the command of Yuan Shikai.

1895-1897

There was a forerunner to the effort of modernising the Chinese army, created before the end of the Sino-Japanese War: in February 1895, the Qing court assembled its Dingwu or the Pacification Army ( Dingwu jun), consisting of 10 battalions or ying, totaling 4,750 men. This was initially organized by  aided by German advisor Constantin von Hanneken this force however was after 1 year of training regarded as not having been trained sufficiently to western standards.

The command of this Pacification Army was turned over to Yuan Shikai by mid-December 1895, and within a few months was renamed the Newly Created Army ( Xinjian Lujun) and expanded to 7,000 men. (Yuan's Newly Created Army was later to become the Guards Army's Right Division (Wuwei Youjun).)

The monthly expenses of the brigade were 70,000 taels (840,000 taels annually).

The Newly Created Army (or simply the New Army) that was 7,000 men strong then became the most formidable of the three army groups stationed near Beijing and proved effective against the Boxers in Shandong province. Yuan refused to obey the Imperial Court's orders to halt his suppression of the Boxers when the Eight-Nation Alliance invaded China during the rebellion and refused to obey orders to fight the alliance.

The New Army was gradually expanded and upgraded in the following years. Yuan became increasingly disrespectful of the dynasty and only loyal to the party from which he benefited; his defection to Cixi against the Guangxu Emperor was a major blow to the Hundred Days' Reform. After 1900, Yuan's troops were the only militia that the Qing court could rely on amidst revolutionary uprisings throughout China.

Following the disgracing of Li Hongzhang in the First Sino-Japanese war the Manchu Ronglu was made chief commander of the forces in Zhili and eventually Viceroy of Zhili in 1898 he was also minister of war for most of this period.

General reform 
During and following the Qing defeat(s) in the First Sino-Japanese war many officials advocated reform of the military. Hu Yufen a progressive official advocated for a completely new army to be trained and raised with 50,000 in the Beiyang region, 30,000 in the Nayang region, 20,000 each in Guangdong and Hubei with the other provinces raising 10,000 each. 

Constantin von Hanneken a German advisor to the Qing military proposed raising 100,000 men this recommendation was supported by the Duban Junwu chu or the War council assembled during the war, it then memorialised the Grand Council calling for reform whilst the Manchus of the Council supported the reform the Han members did not

In response to von Hanneken's proposal Sheng Xuanhuai proposed that due to expenditure of the Green standard and the Yong YIng amounting to over 20mil taels each annually it would be better to disband these forces numbering some 800,000 and replace them with 300,000 western-style troops raised according to local conditions akin to the idea of Hu Yufen, however the Zongli Yamen retorted that disbanding such a large army would be extremely difficult and came out in favour of a more gradual program of reform with modernisation being extended to the existing forces.

The Throne approved the creation of 2 German-style brigades but unlike previous reforms this was not a mere copy of drill and weapons but it followed German organisation patterns as well as German training and tactics in addition to drill and weaponry these were the Self-Strengthening Army of Zhang Zhidong and the Newly Created Army of Yuan Shikai.

8 Banners 
It is important to note that despite the criticism of the old-style and inefficient Green standard and Yong Ying were common there were no immediate proposals for reform of the 8 banners by the Han officials the Manchus still closely guarding the 8 banners.

In late 1895 Yinchang was ordered to choose and instruct Manchu officers at the Tianjin Military academy in anticipation of them taking command.

Military education 
Zhang Zhidong declared in 1896 in a memorial to the Throne that the reason for German military pre-eminence was the universal education of its officer corps and asked for a military academy  and railway school to be established in Nanjing this was approved and Zhang organised the training of 150 Chinese cadets under German intstruction on a 3 year course involving techniques, strategy, tactics of the infantry, artillery engineers and both fortress and field artillery, surveying and cartography. The railway school enrolled 90 students.

Newly created Army and Yuan Shikai 
Yuan was appointed as commander of the brigade in December 1895 and immediately began reform of the unit. The infantry was divided into 2 regiments with 2-3 battalions each, the artilery into 2 regiments with 2-3 battalions each with a QF, heavy and reserve component, the cavalry into 4 troops and the engineers into 6 groups based on their tasks. The 7,000 man upper strength limit was rapidly achieved by the unit. A German language school was established and 3 foreign officers instructed the cavalry, artillery and infantry, the upper organisation and staff components of the unit were also westernised as was the maintenance of telegraph communications and the introduction of night fighting something previously avoided by Chinese armies. To combat corruption Yuan instituted a new system where officers personally handed their funds to the soldiers under their comamnd from Yuan's own HQ under his personal supervision. Yuan like Zhang was one of the few Chinese officials who not only paid his troops well but actually paid them on time.

Pace of reform 
The incompetence of the officers and the technical defincies of the military were routinely attacked by imperial censors and the Throne ordered the Board of War to deliberate on the matter of modernisation of the officer corps something not rectified until several years later with the abolition of the military examination.

The pace of reform and its extent was diluted and slowed by the corruption, favourtism and general negligence in the bureaucracy and the throne often issued edicts and demanded the bureaucrats fire the old, incompetent and weak and report them to the Board of Punishment but the bureaucrats rarely did this instead shielding one another especially at higher levels this did not create an environment conducive for reform. 

Only minor increases in the number of modernised troops was made in the period from 1897 to the Boxer rebellion whilst the support for reform was almost universal even amongst the Tartar-Generals the actual extent of reform was minimal. The Tartar-General of Heilongjiang even praised the ability of his forces in fighting bandits and their lack of reform whilst simultaneously admitting they would be useless in true combat spears and bows were still commonplace and the Heilongjiang general complained that it was too expensive to equip his entire force with rifles and instead asked for permission to make breech loaded jingals a weapon similar in cost.

Other Armies 
General Nie Shicheng took 30 battalions of the yong ying and organised them into a 15,000 strong force based on German organisational patterns and established a military school where 2 Germans taught language and technical subjects, However Nie's army whilst better than other Chinese armies did not approach that of Yuan's or Zhang's.

Finances 
The estimates for the revenue of the central government range from 87,979,000 taels to 92,285,000, with roughly half the amount (45 million taels) going to the military including all forms of expenditure naval and land. The local armies navies and fortresses were estimated to cost 27,00,000 taels with 10,000,000 for the Beiyang and Nanyang fleets with 8,000,000 for the forts and their guns . The Board of War and Board of Revenue jointly reported the cost of the militia, Defense Army, Disciplined forces and new-style troops to cost over 20,000,000 taels the only accurate figures are that of expenditure on the arsenals at 3,385,000 taels the Green standard including the Disciplined forces (the modernised Green standard) were reportedly costing 10,000,000 taels annually and the Bannermen 4,000,000 taels and 1,000,000 piculs of rice (60,000,000 kg). The reason for the number of the breakdown exceeding the total is due to the signifcant overlapping between units and therefore their numbers and their related cost with provinces often subsidising other provinces and the central government also subsidising them whilst some provinces provided and received subsidies, for example in 1894 Zhejiang provided not only for its own military but also that of the Manchu and Chinese in Beijing, the Beiyang fleet and the cost of re-organisation in Manchuria.

1898-1900

100 Days reform 
The 100 Days reform initiated by the Guangxu emperor also affected military affairs as the Emperor desired a comprehensive reform of the state. The Throne complained of the lack of reform enacted in the provinces especially the continued corruption and military bloat caused by padded muster-rolls and the failure to disband the Green Standard Army, within the same edict the Throne called for new local militia and volunteer units to be raised and to replace the Green Standard this was the same approach used 30 years earlier by Zeng Guofan and whilst it might have brought about a temporary boost to military power it would inevitably devolve back into corruption and stagnation as the Yong Ying had done. However, the throne did pass an edict on the recommendation of Hu Yufen to abolish the military exam which was agreed to be phased out by 1900, the 10,000 strong Peking Field Force left to languish since 1865 was to be given a refresher course in western-style training. However, when the experienced and more politically able Prince Gong passed away the pace of reform accelerated even further. Weng Tonghe, the Emperor's former tutor and a conservative the last such advisor to the Emperor was dismissed leaving the Grand Council entirely in the hands of the reformers, however the Emperor maintained Ronglu a conservative as the Viceroy of Zhili a mistake which he would regret and his position on the Board of War was given to the conservative K'ang-i. The Emperor even discussed the possibility of ordering the bannermen who were a drain on the state treasury to enter a different occupation and not live solely on the state stipend given to them. The Throne also ordered the provinces to disband the useless soldiers and the provinces raised their opposition some counter-proposed the reduction of militia and Green standard troops or stated that they had reduced their military forces to the extent that any further downsizing would constitute a danger. Ultimately, little military reform was enacted by the Guangxu Emperor during the brief period of reform.

A proposal for universal military training was proposed and approved by the Emperor in the largest departure from the traditional organisation of the military with all men in a given region being given military training and then act as a national reserve force for the military. The province was enacted with the most fervour in Southeastern China particularly Guangxi and Guangdong where the strength of the reformers was the most apparent. However, the Throne still did not take the lead even in this reform program instead delegating the program to the Viceroys and Governors who had in the previous decades failed to deliver thus it was likely for this program to end in failure too.

Cixi's reforms 
Cixi following the coup began improving her control over the military namely by maintaining the decentralised command of the military so as to deny any one official too much military power whilst simultaneously increasing the forces under her command and those under the control of the Manchus, she continued the adoption of western drill and the importation of weaponry but the necessary support services for a modern army remained neglected. Cixi continued and re-issued the edicts regarding the disbandment of old units however they continued to exist alongside the newer modern western-style units leading to a large cost which hindered further reform as the finances of the state could not simultaneously support a large modern army and a very large unmodern army. Cixi however did maintain the loyalty of the troops something Guangxu failed to achieve as she generously gave the troops of Yuan Dong and Nie money for their support against the Guangxu emperor and his reformers. 

Ronglu a Manchu was given unprecedented military being appointed simultaneously as Grand Councillor, Controller of the Board of war, Imperial Commissioner over the forces of Song Qing, Yuan Shikai, Nie Sicheng and Dong Fuxiang, thus centralising all forces around the capital under a loyalist Manchu official, and commander of forces in the Beiyang region (the area around the Bohai bay) the new Manchu Viceroy was to assist him. Cixi did not extend such centralisation to the other provinces but did continue the universal military service program ordering officials to encourage such organisations and to hire ex-bandits and criminals and give them a legitimate career in the military not conducive to an effective military but cheaper than fighting the bandits. Cixi re-instated the military exam on the path to abolishment by order of Guangxu adding a category on firearms in addition to archery and swordsmanship she did also turn down a request to abolish technical subjects in the provincial colleges and modern schools.  

K'ang-i the President of the Board of war was sent on an inspection tour of 1899 to improve the defenses of Liangguang and to raise money in the aspect of finances he was successful being given the sobriquet "imperial high extortioner" by the foreign press.

Wuwei Corps 
Ronglu proposed to the Throne that the Wuwei Corps be formed from 4 divisions (later expanded to 5 with the additional Centre division) the Throne agreed and the Corps was formed the 5 Divisions being the Centre under Ronglu, the Front of Nie Shicheng trained by Germans then Russians and armed with Mauser rifles artillery and Maxim guns but poorly disciplined , the Left of Song Qing similar arms to the Front division, the Rear of Dong Fuxiang poorly equipped and armed but potentially useful and the Right of Yuan Shikai of the 5 divisions Yuan was regarded as the superior. Cixi further ordered the training of 12,000 Anhui army soldiers and 19,000 Disciplined army soldiers for an additional 31,000.

The 5 divisions were to have 8 ying (battalions) 5 of infantry and 1 each of cavalry, artillery and engineers each division was to also have a training battalion attached with each battalion having 4 companies of 250 (old-style formations had their Ying at 500 nominally in practice around 300) again the aims were not met and only the Centre and Right divisions actually conformed to the new organisation. Ronglu also obtained large amounts of funds some 400,000 taels from the Hubu for his force of 10,000 (on paper) simultaneously the Banner army at least 200,000 and potentially up to 350,000 strong had less than 5 million taels and many officers were transferred from across the empire to this army at Ronglu's request.

Arms importation 1895-1900 
The Qing government recognised the weakness of its domestic armaments industry and sought foreign imports to bridge the gap. In 1899 the Imperial Army ordered 460,000 Mauser rifles and 3,000,000 cartridges and by 1900 the Qing had imported some 207 machine guns, 71 fortress guns and 123 field guns with another 200 Krupp mountain guns being ordered.

1901-1903

Command and education 
Zhang Zhidong and Liu Kunyi jointly proposed the formation of an Imperial General Staff modelled on the Japanese equvalent and that the chief of the General Staff be a compotent professional soldier not just a Noble or Imperial Clansmen this could have centralised military forces and allowed for a standardisation of training, pay and equipment and become an engine of reform however the Throne did not approve it until 1909. Though the 2 officials did get the Throne to abolish the military exam in 1901 replacing it with direct application to provincial armies by the 2nd and 3rd rank and to await enrollment in military schools in the expectation of their establishment, to obtain a steady and large flow of trained officers an edict mandated all provinces to open military academies and those with academies (Yuan, Zhang and Liu) were to create a national regulation regarding military education. In 1902 even bannermen were obligated to attend the Military schools though the Imperial Guardsmen were still tested in their proficiency with the bow.

Organisational Reform 
The throne also ordered once again to demobilise the Green Standard and militia to a more efficient force by discharging the useless. The remaining forces were then to be organised into a standing army (Changbei Jun) a first reserve (Xubei jun) and a gendarmerie (Xunjing jun). Standing army units were to gradually proliferate across the Empire and to then later form the new army (Lujun) the reserves served as a safe haven for the old-style units allowing them to continue existing despite repeated orders to disband them. In 1902 the Throne informed the provinces once again of their intent to demobilise the greater portion of the Green Standard and that land formerly alloted to the maintenance of soldiers in substitution of pay would devolve back to the Throne. The reform edicts were not followed as the Throne complained in 1902 that the Manchu-Generals, Viceroys and Governors were dragging their heels.

The increasing uselessness of the Bannermen spurred the Throne into action as military power increasingly became Han Chinese the Throne sought to balance this, Yuan Shikai was ordered to train 3,000 Bannermen and later it was planned for an additional 3,000 to be trained. Ronglu also was rumoured to begin training of 30,000 bannermen in 1901 but his death ended this before it even began.

Beiyang Army 
Yuan Shikai as commander of the army was ordered to form 2 divisions one of which was to be Manchu instead Yuan trained the one Manchu division and prepared a corps of 4 divisions 3 of which were Han Chinese. The 2 initial divisions were to form a Corps of 19,120 men organised into 42 battalions with a total annual cost of 2,387,600 taels not including armament. Yuan Shikai hired Japanese instructors and advisors and established many schools offering diverse courses such as topography and ballistics as well as sending cadets to be educated in Japan.

Hubei Army 
Zhang had organised a bodyguard of 7,750 modern trained men organised into 1 brigade of 11 battalions 8 infantry and 1 each of cavalry, artillery and engineers, however Captain Gadoffre reported that there were 14,750 foreign-trained men whilst Zhang reported 9,500 to the throne. In Hubei there were 15,700 modern trained troops including 7,000 Bannermen and 42,000 soldiers described as "armed coolies" Zhang had also standardised the armament of his forces using the Hanyang Arsenal and arms imported from Germany. Gaddofre also reported that the modern units were proficient in drill and on the parade ground but in sustained exercises and manoeuvres the control over units broke down, artillery was underutilised generally and marksmanship was mediocre. Zhang began to transfer the modern officers from his bodyguard to the Provincial forces only for these officers to neglect their foreign principles and revert back to their old ways, this spurred the formation of military schools for Commissioned and Non-Commissioned officers.

Other Provincial Reforms 
Liu Kunyi as Viceroy of Liangjiang controlled the vital lower Yangtze region and began to organise new military forces. Liu used the Defense Army (yong ying) to organise 2 standing Army units the remaining 40 battalions were to be re-organised as first-class reserves. However, Liu maintained the old-style organisation in his bodyguard his troops were ill-trained and ill-equipped and trained officers were not given admittance to the formation. Liu also organised military schools similar to Zhang Zhidong's but used Chinese graduates from these schools to train his men rather than directly by foreigners and all officers under the rank of Lt. Col were ordered to partake in lectures on military science. 

In other provinces modernisation was limited to the German goosestep and issuing men repeating rifles though men were organised into standing army and first-class reserves across the empire but not universally and even this change was often just one in name and the new organisation was not followed.

1904-1906 

The previous reforms were deemed insufficient and in the face of the Russo-Japanese war the Throne acted much more decisively and formed the Commission for Army reorganisation disparaging the fact that whilst reform had been called for little of substance had been achieved and it became necessary for the Throne to centralise reform and enact it centrally Prince Qing was named director and Yuan Shikai and Tieh'liang as assistant directors.

Proposal by Sir Robert Hart 
Robert Hart the Inspector-General of the Imperial Maritime Customs Service reasoned that the Qing weakness allowing Russia and Japan to wage war in Manchuria was due to fiscal weakness he therefore proposed a uniform land tax at a low rate that would yield 400,000,000 taels to the Dynasty to be controlled by the Central Government. This money would firstly be used to form 4 armies of 50,000 each with each army supported by first and second class reserves. Then 3 modern squadrons of warships could be obtained and the establishment of 4 modern arsenals could be organised to produce equipment and 4 military schools to produce officers. The military would cost 90,000,000 taels and 160,000,000 taels would be spent on affording good pay to reduce the need for officials to rely on corruption to support themselves. The proposal was rejected due to provincial opposition though they were not revolutionary as previous similar proposals were made by the Throne and officials themselves but not acted upon.

Renaming and revolution

The Chien Men gate refers to the Zhengyangmen.

The successful example of the new army was followed in other provinces. The New Army of Yuan was renamed the Beiyang Army on June 25, 1902 after Yuan was officially promoted to the "Minister of Beiyang". By the end of the dynasty in 1911, most provinces had established sizable new armies; however, Yuan's army was still most powerful, comprising six groups and numbering more than 75,000 men.  The Qing unified all of China's armies into one force, the "Chinese Army", which was commonly still called the New Army. Two-thirds of the Chinese Army was Yuan's Beiyang Army.

During the Xinhai Revolution, most of the non-Beiyang forces as well as some Beiyang units in the Chinese Army revolted against the Qing. Yuan led the Beiyang Army into opposing the revolution while also negotiating for the Qing's surrender and his ascendency to the presidency of the new republic.

Politics and modernisation

Yuan kept a tight grip on the command of the army after its establishment by installing officials only loyal to him; however, after his death in 1916, the army groups were quickly fragmented into four major forces of combative warlords, according to the locations of garrisons. These army groups and generals played different roles in the politics of the Republic of China until the establishment of the People's Republic of China following the Communist Party of China's victory in the Chinese Civil War.

One of the most important legacies of the New Army was the professionalisation of the military and perhaps introduction of militarism to China. Previously, almost any male could join and soldiers were mostly poor, landless and illiterate peasants. The New Armies moved beyond the personalised recruitment and patronage of Zeng Guofan and Zuo Zongtang, which had been successful in the mid-century uprisings, but seemed discredited in the face of modern armies in Japan and the West. The New Army began screening volunteers and created modern military academies to train officers. The modernisation and professionalisation of the New Army impressed many in the gentry class to join. The young Chiang Kai-shek, for instance, briefly attended Yuan's Baoding Military Academy, which thus influenced him in forming his Whampoa Academy, which trained a succeeding generation of soldiers. Yuan and his successors equated military dominance of the political sphere with national survival. The political army would become a dominant force in China for much of the twentieth century.

Zhang Zhidong's army 
Following the disastorous performance of the Qing armies in the First Sino-Japanese war Zhang zhidong the then Viceroy of Huguang stated in a memorial that he intended to raise a 10,000 strong German-trained army with 8 infantry battalions of 250, 2 artillery battalions of  200, 2 cavalry battalions of 180 and 1 engineer battalion of 100 men with more men including doctors, veterinarians and armourers but no support staff such as quarter-masters, transportation or signal units. 35 Germans were to serve in the new army not as instructors but as actual commanders of the units. Every 6 months the German officers were to rotate to a new group of soldiers matching the numbers listed above and to train these men thus in 2 years Zhang Zhidong was to possess 10,000 crack German-trained soldiers it was estimated the 10,000 strong force would cost 440,000 taels annually. The memorial was approved however the force was transferred to Liu Kunyi who did not raise the army beyond its original group and increase it to the proposed 10,000 men as the throne feared provincial officials commanding powerful armies and wanted the force under the more conservative Liu.

Notable figures of Beiyang

Yuan Shikai (袁世凱)
Duan Qirui (段祺瑞)
Wang Yingkai (王英楷)
Wu Peifu (吳佩孚)
Feng Guozhang (馮國璋)
Sun Chuanfang (孫傳芳)
Xu Shichang (徐世昌)
Wang Shizhen (王士珍)
Cao Kun (曹錕)
Zhang Xun (張勳)
Feng Yuxiang (馮玉祥)
Lu Yongxiang (盧永祥)
Xu Shuzheng (徐樹錚)
Zhang Zhizhong (張治中)
Song Zheyuan (宋哲元)
Tang Shengzhi (唐生智)
Qin Dechun (秦德純)
Qi Xieyuan (齊燮元)

See also
Military of the Qing dynasty
Military history of China before 1911
Beiyang Army
Ever Victorious Army

Explanatory notes

References

Citations

Sources 
 
 
 
 
 
 (originally published: Princeton, N.J., Princeton University Press, 1955) 
 
  abstract
 Reprinted in: 
 Yoshihiro, Hatano, "The New Armies." in Mary Wright, ed. (Yale UP, 1968) pp 365–382.

Military units and formations of the Qing dynasty
Military units and formations of the Boxer Rebellion
Military history of the Qing dynasty
1911 Revolution
Military units and formations established in 1895
1895 establishments in China